Dieste is a Spanish surname. Notable people with the surname include:
Eladio Dieste (1917–2000), Uruguayan engineer
Rafael Dieste (1899–1981), Galician poet, philosopher and short-story writer

Spanish-language surnames